Temoe, or Te Moe, is a small atoll of the Gambier Islands in French Polynesia. It is located in the far southeast of the Tuamotu group archipelago.

Temoe Atoll is trapezoidal in shape and bound by a continuous reef with many small shallow spillways. Its islands are low and flat and the lagoon has no navigable pass to enter it.

Temoe is permanently uninhabited. Administratively it belongs to the commune of the Gambier Islands.

History
Temoe was formerly inhabited. There are ancient Polynesian archaeological remains on this lonely atoll; foremost among these are temple structures (marae).

It is said that buccaneer Edward Davis might have arrived at Temoe and Mangareva in 1686; there is no historical proof of this.

The first recorded European to effectively arrive at Temoe was British mariner James Wilson on the ship Duff in 1797. Captain Wilson named this atoll "Crescent Island".

In 1838 Christian missionaries moved all the inhabitants of Temoe to Mangareva to help in construction work.

Rats were eradicated from Temoe Island in 2015. Their eradication was confirmed in 2020.

See also

 Desert island
 List of islands

References

External links

Atoll list 
Atoll names
Island Conservation: Acteon and Gambier Archipelagos Restoration Project

Atolls of the Tuamotus
Islands of the Gambier Islands
Uninhabited islands of French Polynesia
Island restoration